Lisa Rae Jacob (born May 13, 1974) is an American former competition swimmer who won two gold medals at the 1996 Summer Olympics in Atlanta.

Jacob won three gold medals in the 200-meter freestyle, the 4×100-meter relay, and the 4×200-meter relay at the 1991 Pan American Games.  Later, she attended Stanford University, where she swam for the Stanford Cardinal swimming and diving team.  She won three Pacific-10 Conference championships and two NCAA championships in the 1995–96 season.  The highlight of her career was at the 1996 Summer Olympics, where as a member of the United States team she won gold medals in both the 4×100 freestyle relay, and the 4×200 freestyle relay.

Lisa was married in Santa Barbara, CA in 2004 and resides with her husband outside of Washington, D.C.

See also
 List of Olympic medalists in swimming (women)
 List of Stanford University people

References

1974 births
Living people
American female freestyle swimmers
Olympic gold medalists for the United States in swimming
Stanford Cardinal women's swimmers
Swimmers at the 1991 Pan American Games
Swimmers at the 1996 Summer Olympics
Medalists at the 1996 Summer Olympics
Pan American Games gold medalists for the United States
Pan American Games medalists in swimming
Universiade medalists in swimming
Universiade gold medalists for the United States
Medalists at the 1995 Summer Universiade
Medalists at the 1991 Pan American Games